Sweet November is the title of a number-one R&B single by group Troop written by Babyface. The hit song spent one week at number-one on the US R&B chart and peaked at fifty-eight on the Billboard Hot 100.

The song was originally recorded by The Deele, which included Babyface at the time, and released in 1985 as a part of the album Material Thangz.

References

See also
List of number-one R&B singles of 1992 (U.S.)

1992 singles
Songs written by Babyface (musician)
1985 songs
Troop (band) songs